Luis V. Rey (born 1955) is a Spanish-Mexican artist and illustrator. A 1977 graduate of the San Carlos Academy, part of the National Autonomous University of Mexico, he was among the contributors of the weekly Barcelona satirical magazine El Papus. He was sentenced due to a cartoon featuring the Pope wearing a swimsuit.

Rey is best known for his innovative work in the field of dinosaur paleoart. In conjunction with Robert T. Bakker, he promoted awareness of the developing evidence for feathered dinosaurs. Rey is an active member of the Society of Vertebrate Paleontology and of the Dinosaur Society (UK). Rey was the main illustrator for Dr. Thomas R. Holtz Jr.'s Dinosaurs (2007), and he won the Two-Dimensional Art category for the Society of Vertebrate Paleontology's 2008 Lanzendorf-National Geographic PaleoArt Prize.

References

External links
 Luis V. Rey web gallery - Dinosaurs & Paleontology
 Index of Rey cover art compiled at Locus Magazine
 Dinosaur Delineator file on Rey

1955 births
Living people
Mexican illustrators
Mexican people of Spanish descent
National Autonomous University of Mexico alumni
Mexican emigrants to the United Kingdom
Paleoartists